Kyle McDonough is an American ice hockey coach and former center who was an All-American for Vermont.

Career
McDonough was star for Vermont for four seasons in the later half of the 1980's. Despite low totals, he led the Catamounts in scoring as a freshman, helping the team post its first winning season in six years. He continued to lead the offense for most of his career and helped Vermont make its first NCAA tournament appearance in 1988. His production increased in his senior season and he was named an All-American. Vermont reached its first ECAC championship game but lost to St. Lawrence.

After graduating, McDonough headed to Europe to begin is professional career. He had nearly the same production in the Metal Ligaen as he had in college but couldn't help Aalborg finish better than 7th in the league. He moved to the Eliteserien the following year, recording nearly two points per game for Viking IK. After a year in Norway, McDonough was on the move again and spent the bulk of the next year in Scotland. He scored over 3 points per game for the Murrayfield Racers finishing second on the team and the led the club in scoring during the postseason.

McDonough returned to Viking IK the following year and found himself with a new club each year until settling in with Frisk Asker Ishockey in 1996. McDonough found his greatest success with Frisk Asker, leading the entire league in scoring four different times. He was productive all the way until the end of his career, serving as an alternate captain every year for the club and leading them to the league championship in 2002. McDonough is currently the 7th all-time leading scorer for Norway's top league and the only non-Norwegian in the top 10.

With his playing career finished, McDonough returned to New Hampshire and began working as a teacher. He eventually found himself behind the bench of ice hockey team at his alma mater, Manchester Memorial High School. He was inducted into the Vermont Athletic Hall of Fame in 1999 and the New Hampshire Legends of Hockey in 2003.

Happy Gilmore
McDonough was the inspiration for the title character in Happy Gilmore. While golfing with his friend Adam Sandler, McDonough would drive the ball much farther than the rest of the group with the consensus being that playing ice hockey helped him this respect. The anecdote was used as the premise for the movie. McDonough later acted in a scene for Grown Ups 2 but it left out of the final edit.

Statistics

Regular season and playoffs

Awards and honors

References

External links

1966 births
Living people
Ice hockey people from New Hampshire
Sportspeople from Manchester, New Hampshire
American men's ice hockey centers
Vermont Catamounts men's ice hockey players
AHCA Division I men's ice hockey All-Americans
Aalborg Pirates players
Raleigh IceCaps players
Murrayfield Racers players
Stjernen Hockey players
Huddinge IK players
Frisk Asker Ishockey players
American expatriate ice hockey players in Scotland
American expatriate ice hockey players in Norway
American expatriate ice hockey players in Sweden
American expatriate ice hockey players in Denmark